This is a list of Swedish football transfers in the summer transfer window 2014 by club.

Only transfers in and out between 15 July – 11 August 2014 of the Allsvenskan and Superettan are included.

Allsvenskan

AIK

In:

Out:

BK Häcken

In:

Out:

Djurgårdens IF

In:

Out:

Falkenbergs FF

In:

Out:

Gefle IF

In:

Out:

Halmstads BK

In:

Out:

Helsingborgs IF

In:

Out:

IF Brommapojkarna

In:

Out:

IF Elfsborg

In:

Out:

IFK Göteborg

In:

Out:

IFK Norrköping

In:

Out:

Kalmar FF

In:

Out:

Malmö FF

In:

Out:

Mjällby AIF

In:

Out:

Åtvidabergs FF

In:

Out:

Örebro SK

In:

Out:

Superettan

Assyriska FF

In:

Out:

Degerfors IF

In:

Out:

GAIS

In:

Out:

GIF Sundsvall

In:

Out:

Hammarby IF

In:

Out:

Husqvarna FF

In:

Out:

IFK Värnamo

In:

Out:

IK Sirius

In:

Out:

Jönköping Södra

In:

Out:

Landskrona BoIS

In:

Out:

Ljungskile SK

In:

Out:

Syrianska FC

In:

Out:

Varbergs BoIS FC

In:

Out:

Ängelholms FF

In:

Out:

Östers IF

In:

Out:

Östersunds FK

In:

Out:

References

Allsvenskan references

Superettan references

External links
 Official site of the SvFF 

Trans
2014
Sweden